The rank of Sirdar – a variant of Sardar – was assigned to the British Commander-in-Chief of the British-controlled Egyptian Army in the late 19th and early 20th centuries. The Sirdar resided at the Sirdaria, a three-block-long property in Zamalek which was also the home of British military intelligence in Egypt.

List of officeholders

References

Military ranks of Egypt
Military history of Egypt
Military history of the British Empire